National Labour Federation may be:
National Labor Federation in Eretz-Israel
National Labour Federation Pakistan
National Labour Federation (UK), a defunct general union
National Labor Federation

See also
Trades Union Congress